Denmark competed at the 2016 Summer Paralympics in Rio de Janeiro, Brazil, from 7 September to 18 September 2016. They had athletes participating in athletics, cycling, equestrian, shooting, swimming and table tennis. They won a total of seven medals; one gold, two silver and four bronze.

Disability classifications 

Every participant at the Paralympics has their disability grouped into one of five disability categories; amputation, the condition may be congenital or sustained through injury or illness; cerebral palsy; wheelchair athletes, there is often overlap between this and other categories; visual impairment, including blindness; Les autres, any physical disability that does not fall strictly under one of the other categories, for example dwarfism or multiple sclerosis. Each Paralympic sport then has its own classifications, dependent upon the specific physical demands of competition. Events are given a code, made of numbers and letters, describing the type of event and classification of the athletes competing. Some sports, such as athletics, divide athletes by both the category and severity of their disabilities, other sports, for example swimming, group competitors from different categories together, the only separation being based on the severity of the disability.

Medallists

Athletics

Cycling

Road

Equestrian 
The country qualified to participate in the team event at the Rio Games.  They earned an additional individual slot via the Para Equestrian Individual Ranking List Allocation method.

Individual

Team

"#" indicates that the score of this rider does not count in the team competition, since only the best three results of a team are counted.

Shooting 

The first opportunity to qualify for shooting at the Rio Games took place at the 2014 IPC Shooting World Championships in Suhl. Shooters earned spots for their NPC.  The United Arab Emirates earned a qualifying spot at this competition  in the R5 – 10m Air Rifle Prone Mixed SH2  event as a result of the performance of Johnny Andersen.

Swimming 

Men

Women

Table tennis 

Men

Women

See also
Denmark at the 2016 Summer Olympics

References 

Nations at the 2016 Summer Paralympics
2016
2016 in Danish sport